Thedachloa is a genus of flowering plants belonging to the family Poaceae.

Its native range is Northwestern Australia.

Species:

Thedachloa annua

References

Poaceae
Poaceae genera